The 2020 Arab Cup U-20 was the fourth edition of the Arab Cup U-20 organised by the Union of Arab Football Associations (UAFA) for the men's under-20 national teams of the Arab world. It is the first tournament played in nearly eight years. The competition took place in Saudi Arabia between 17 February and 4 March. It was held in Dammam, Khobar and Riyadh.

Teams

Participating teams

Match officials

Below the list of the referees and the assistant referees of the tournament

Referees

CAF - Africa
 Lotfi Bekouassa (Algeria)
 Saddam Houssein Mansour (Djibouti)
 Ahmed El Ghandour  (Egypt)
 Abdulwahid Huraywidah (Libya)
 Mathioro Diabel (Mauritania)
 Adil Zourak (Morocco)
 Sabri Mohammed Fadul (Sudan)
 Mehrez Melki (Tunisia)

AFC - Asia        
 Mohammed Bunafoor Juma (Bahrain)
 Mohammed Wathik Al-Baag (Iraq)
 Murad Al Zawahreh (Jordan)
 Saad Al-Fadhli Kalefah (Kuwait)
 Mohamad Darwich (Lebanon)
 Sameh Al-Qassas (Palestine)
 Saoud Al-Adba (Qatar)
 Faisal Al-Balawi (Saudi Arabia)
 Ahmed Eisa Mohamed Darwish (United Arab Emirates)

Assistant referees

CAF - Africa
 Abbes Akram Zerhouni (Algeria)
 Liban Abdirazack Ahmed (Djibouti)
 Samir Gamal Saad Mohamed  (Egypt)
 Basm Saef El-Naser (Libya)
 Mohamed Mahmoud Youssouf (Mauritania)
 Hicham Ait Abbou (Morocco)
 Omer Hamid Ahmed (Sudan)
 Mohamed Bakir (Tunisia)

AFC - Asia        
 Salman Talasi (Bahrain)
 Akram Ali Jabbar (Iraq)
 Ahmad Abbas (Kuwait)
 Farooq Assi (Palestine)
 Ramzan Al-Naemi (Qatar)
 Faisal Al-Qahtani (Saudi Arabia)
 Oqubah Al-Haweij (Syria)
 Ali Al-Nuaimi (United Arab Emirates)

Draw
The group stage draw was made on 20 January 2020. The 16 teams were drawn into four groups.

Venues

Squads
Players born on or after 1 January 2000 were eligible to compete.

Group stage
The top two teams of each group advanced to the quarter-finals.

All times are local, AST (UTC+3).

Group A

Group B

Group C

Group D

Knockout stage

Bracket

Quarter-finals

Semi-finals

Final

Goalscorers

Own goal
 El Mokhtar Bilal (vs Iraq)

Broadcasting rights
Below the list of broadcasting rights.

References

External links
2020 Arab Cup U-20 - goalzz.com

Arab Cup U-20
Arab
Arab
Arab
Arab
Arab
Arab
Arab